

Adolf Raegener (17 February 1895 – 17 August 1983) was a general in the Wehrmacht of Nazi Germany during World War II. He was a recipient of the  Knight's Cross of the Iron Cross with Oak Leaves. He was born at Kleinleinungen.

Awards and decorations
 Iron Cross (1914)  2nd Class  & 1st Class (2 March 1917)(5 June 1916)
 Clasp to the Iron Cross (1939) 2nd Class (1 October 1939) & 1st Class (17 May 1940)
 Knight's Cross of the Iron Cross with Oak Leaves
 Knight's Cross on 25 June 1940 as Oberstleutnant and commander of Infanterie-Regiment 309
 842nd Oak Leaves on 17 April 1945 as Generalleutnant and commander of Verteidigungsbereich Magdeburg

References

Sources

 
 

1895 births
1983 deaths
People from Südharz
Lieutenant generals of the German Army (Wehrmacht)
German Army personnel of World War I
Recipients of the Knight's Cross of the Iron Cross with Oak Leaves
German prisoners of war in World War II held by the United States
People from the Province of Saxony
Recipients of the clasp to the Iron Cross, 1st class
20th-century Freikorps personnel
Military personnel from Saxony-Anhalt
German Army generals of World War II